"Prison Break Anthem" is a single by Belgian rapper Kaye Styles, released in 2006 on the Mostiko label. Styles version was used as the theme song for the television series Prison Break in Belgium. It peaked at number 3 on the Flanders singles chart.

Track listing

Charts

Release history

References 

2006 singles
2006 songs